Graig Syfyrddin or just The Graig, is a 423m high hill near Grosmont in north-eastern Monmouthshire, Wales. The summit knoll is known as Edmund's Tump. The hill consists of an isolated mass of the micaceous sandstones of the Brownstones Formation, a unit of the Old Red Sandstone well known from the nearby Black Mountains, of which it can be considered an outlier in both the geographical and geological sense.

The Three Castles Walk, a waymarked recreational walk in Monmouthshire linking Grosmont Castle, White Castle (Wales) and Skenfrith Castle passes over the hill.

References

External links
 www.geograph.co.uk : photos of Graig Syfyrddin and surrounding area

Marilyns of Wales
Mountains and hills of Monmouthshire